The GEB or Geb may refer to:
 Geb, an Egyptian god
 Games and Economic Behavior, a scholarly journal
 Gödel, Escher, Bach, a book by Douglas Hofstadter
 Golden Eagle Band of the University of North Georgia
 Golden Eagle Broadcasting, an American television network
 Guiding Eyes for the Blind, an American guide dog training school
 Haile Gebrselassie (born 1973), Ethiopian long-distance runner